Lomatium plummerae (Plummer's lomatium) is a formerly recognized species of plant in the carrot family (Apiaceae). When recognized, it was subdivided into a number of subspecies and varieties. , Plants of the World Online considers the species itself and the variety helleri to be synonyms of Lomatium donnellii, and the varieties austiniae and sonnei as synonyms of Lomatium austiniae, whereas the Jepson eFlora considers the species and the varieties austiniae and sonnei to be synonyms of Lomatium donnellii.

References

plummerae
Historically recognized plant taxa
Taxa named by John Merle Coulter